Gregory T. Crozier (born July 6, 1976) is a Canadian retired professional ice hockey left wing. His father was Joe Crozier, who coached in the National Hockey League and American Hockey League.

Playing career

He played college hockey for the Michigan Wolverines at the University of Michigan where he won National Championships in 1996 and 1998. After turning professional, he played one game for the Pittsburgh Penguins in the NHL against the Boston Bruins on December 6, 2000. He went scoreless in 4:10 of ice time. He also played in the AHL for the Wilkes-Barre/Scranton Penguins, Providence Bruins, Houston Aeros, Albany River Rats, and San Antonio Rampage. 

On November 13, 1999, Crozier scored the first goal in Wilkes-Barre/Scranton Penguins inaugural season at the Northeastern Pennsylvania Civic Arena and Convention Center. The following season, Crozier helped guide the team to a Calder Cup Championship.

Career statistics

Awards and honours

See also

List of players who played only one game in the NHL

References

External links

1976 births
Albany River Rats players
Canadian ice hockey left wingers
Houston Aeros (1994–2013) players
Living people
Michigan Wolverines men's ice hockey players
Pittsburgh Penguins draft picks
Pittsburgh Penguins players
Providence Bruins players
San Antonio Rampage players
Ice hockey people from Calgary
Wilkes-Barre/Scranton Penguins players
NCAA men's ice hockey national champions